Samsung S5600 (also known as Samsung Preston or Samsung Player Star (in France)) was announced in March 2009 and released in June 2009 as part of a range of touch-screen phones being released by Samsung.

A 3.2 megapixel camera, music recognition via the use of Shazam's "Find Music" service, and multi-codec support including H.263, MPEG4 (mp4), and WMV. The  connectivity for Internet is 7.2 Mbit/s HSDPA.

Language support
The phone was the first phone to support the Welsh Language and it followed an earlier experiment by the Samsung company who released a phone that supported the Irish language. The phone has a Welsh menu and a predictive text facility that calls on a database of 44,000 words in Welsh. The phone was offered just in Orange shops in Wales in 2009.

References

s-8000
Mobile phones introduced in 2009